The 2020–21 Air Force Falcons men's basketball team represented the United States Air Force Academy during the 2020–21 NCAA Division I men's basketball season. The Falcons, led by head coach Joe Scott in his first-season and fifth overall after coaching at Air Force from 2000 to 2004, played their home games at the Clune Arena on the Air Force Academy's main campus in Colorado Springs, Colorado as members of the Mountain West Conference.

Previous season 
The Falcons finished the season 12–20, 5–13 in Mountain West play to finish in ninth place. They defeated Fresno State in the first round of the Mountain West tournament before losing in the quarterfinals to San Diego State.

On March 9, 2020, head coach Dave Pilipovich was fired. He finished at Air Force with an eight-year record of 110–151.

Roster

Schedule and results 
Source

|-
!colspan=9 style=| Regular season

|-
!colspan=9 style=| Mountain West tournament

References 

Air Force
Air Force Falcons men's basketball seasons
Air Force Falcons men's basketball
Air Force Falcons men's basketball